Bradley Scott Beckman (December 31, 1964 – December 18, 1989) was an American football tight end in the National Football League for the New York Giants and the Atlanta Falcons. He played college football at the University of Nebraska at Omaha and was drafted in the seventh round of the 1988 NFL Draft by the Minnesota Vikings. Beckman was killed when the car he was a passenger in bumped a car in front of it and then lost control and was hit broadside by a truck. The accident was on I-85 near Lilburn in icy conditions on December 18, 1989, nearly two weeks before Beckman's 25th birthday. His death was the second one for the Falcons that year, and the third in the space of two years. Four weeks prior, offensive tackle Ralph Norwood died in a separate traffic collision; a year before, cornerback David Croudip died of a cocaine overdose. At the time of his death, the Falcons had played 15 out of 16 games in the season. Beckman had played in all 15 games for the Falcons up to that point, starting in two of them.

References

External links

NFL.com player page

1964 births
1989 deaths
Sportspeople from Lincoln, Nebraska
American football tight ends
Nebraska–Omaha Mavericks football players
New York Giants players
Atlanta Falcons players
Road incident deaths in Georgia (U.S. state)